The Bureau of Enquiry and Analysis for Civil Aviation Safety (BEA Sénégal) is the current aviation accident agency in Senegal, a part of the Ministry of Tourism and Air Transport.

As of 2015 the director of the Senegal BEA is Amadou Lamine Traoré.

Investigations
 2015 Senegal mid-air collision

See also
 Agence Nationale de l'Aviation Civile et de la Météorologie (Senegal)

References

External links
 Bureau d'Enquêtes et d'Analyses pour la Sécurité de l'Aviation Civile 

Aviation in Africa
Senegal
Government of Senegal